Michael McCarthy (born 15 November 1976) is a former Irish Labour Party politician who served as a Teachta Dála (TD) for the Cork South-West constituency from 2011 to 2016. He was a Senator for the Labour Panel from 2002 to 2011 and as a local councillor on Cork County Council from 1999 to 2003. 

He was the Labour Party Spokesperson on Marine, and acted as Spokesperson in the Seanad on Agriculture, Community and Rural Affairs, and Communications, Marine and Natural Resources.

Early life
McCarthy is the son of Phyllis and Michael McCarthy and lived in Dunmanway. Phyllis was a psychiatric nurse. At the time of the 1999 local elections, he was employed at Schering Plough pharmaceutical plant in Brinny, West Cork. His brother, Damien, became the youngest vice-president of the Garda Representatives Association (GRA) in 2008, having been elected to its national executive two years earlier. Damien also served as president of the GRA.

Political career

County Councillor
He was elected to Cork County Council in 1999 for the Skibbereen LEA, serving until 2003, having to resign as a sitting Oireachtas member as a result of the abolition of the dual mandate. McCarthy served as chairperson of the Western committee and as vice-chairman of Cork County Council.

Oireachtas
McCarthy stood unsuccessfully as a Labour Party candidate for the Cork South-West constituency at the 2002 and 2007 general elections. He was a Senator for the Labour Panel from 2002 to 2011 (re-elected in 2007). He was the only Labour candidate elected for the Labour Panel in the 2002 Seanad election, at the age of 25. His mother, Phyllis McCarthy, contested the 2004 local elections for Labour.

He was elected to the Dáil at the 2011 general election. He claimed to be the fourth TD from Dunmanway to be elected to the Dail. His wife, Nollagh McCarthy, gave birth to a baby boy during the election campaign. They had one son by this time. In 2012, he chaired a joint committee on the Environment, Culture and Gaeltacht. 

In 2013, despite Labour's membership of the coalition, he opposed the Government's referendum campaign to abolish the Seanad. By doing this, he risked losing the party whip. The all-party parliamentary environment committee (chaired by McCarthy), which had been tasked with examining proposals for new climate change legislation, was divided on the issue of setting binding targets for emissions reductions for 2050. It was asked to consider draft proposals for climate change legislation and an accompanying detailed report prepared by the secretariat of the National Economic and Social Council. The most controversial aspect of the Government proposal was that unlike the previous three efforts at legislation, no set targets were specified for greenhouse gas emissions reductions for 2050, or the intermediate stages in between. This was  notwithstanding that the vast majority of submissions from, and presentations made by, individuals and organisations called for targets by this date of at least 80 per cent below 1990 baseline levels. The report was seen and reported on by the Irish Times ahead of its publication.

In 2014, he ran for Deputy Leadership of the Labour Party. The Irish Independent regarded the contest as a “two-horse race” between McCarthy and Alan Kelly, with the other candidates, Seán Sherlock and Ciara Conway, “lagging behind.”  Both impressed at the various hustings, with McCarthy seen to have done particularly well both in Galway and in Cork.

He told the Irish Independent that threatening phone calls had been made to his constituency office following his criticism of Sinn Féin leader Gerry Adams’ “five-star trip to the US” in an interview on RTÉ’s Morning Ireland. The paper reported that he had “received a furry of abuse, via phone calls and emails, since he criticised the Sinn Fein leadership.” McCarthy claimed that he was told that he and his party colleagues would be "urinated on" as a result of his criticism. McCarthy chaired the Local Government Efficiency Review (LGER) and the LGER Implementation Group. He was chair of the Oireachtas committee on housing. In December 2014, McCarthy, along with other Labour TDs, missed a Dáil vote on a bill to repeal the 8th Amendment, amid suggestions some may have missed it on purpose. 

In 2015, the Irish Examiner claimed that McCarthy would “struggle” to hold on to his seat. He lost his seat at the 2016 general election. After losing his seat, he said to the Irish Times that “I think us new breed of TDs recognised that longevity in politics was no longer guaranteed,” and later told the Southern Star that he had left public life. The paper reported in May 2016 that a ‘lightbulb moment’  for McCarthy led to the gathering of more than 10,000 books and other publications for the London Irish Centre. A campaign to open a library at the Camden centre began in earnest when he wrote to every TD in Dáil Éireann and asked them to donate a book. As the chairman of the Government’s Joint Committee on Environment, Culture and the Gaeltacht – which oversaw part of the project – McCarthy said: “Over 10,000 books, 1,000 recordings and free subscriptions to over 30 Irish newspapers and magazines were finally gathered.”

After politics 
In 2017, it was reported that McCarthy was appointed CEO of the Irish Solar Energy Association. He was appointed to the board of Sophia Housing, a national housing charity. In 2018, McCarthy was also appointed chair of the National Oversight and Audit Commission (NOAC). In 2021, he was appointed director of Cloud Infrastructure Ireland (CII), a trade association within the employer group Ibec.

References

1976 births
Living people
Labour Party (Ireland) TDs
Local councillors in County Cork
Members of the 22nd Seanad
Members of the 23rd Seanad
Members of the 31st Dáil
People from Dunmanway
You're a Star contestants
Labour Party (Ireland) senators
Alumni of Cork Institute of Technology